Li Shu Yeung (born 2 May 1991, in Hong Kong) is a former Hong Kong professional footballer who currently plays as an amateur player for Hong Kong First Division club South China. He played as a right-back.

Club career

Early career
Li was a youth player at Tai Po and he also played for Hong Kong in the Chinese National Games.

Tai Chung
He left Tai Po and joined Tai Chung in the summer of 2009.

Yuen Long
One season later, after Tai Chung released him, he moved to Yuen Long in 2010 to play in the 2010-11 Hong Kong Second Division League.

He joined Tung Chi Ying School's football academy scheme, which is jointly organised by the school and Kitchee. He was repeating F5 and only expected to get 2 to 3 points in the HKCEE. He hoped that by joining the scheme he could continue his studies and play football at the same time.

With Yan Chai Tung Chi Ying Memorial Secondary School football team, Li won the Inter-school title as well as the Most Valuable Player award in the Inter-school football tournament. He already planned to become a football coach in the future and has enrolled for a football coach training course.

In April 2011, Li got the chance from Kitchee and Tung Chi Ying to train in Lloret de Mar, Spain with two other young players.

Hong Kong Sapling
Li was loaned to Hong Kong Sapling in the 2011–12 season. He was sent off after two bookable offences in the 6–0 defeat away to Kitchee. He returned to Yuen Long at the end of the season.

Tai Po
Li left Yuen Long and re-joined First Division club Tai Po in the summer of 2012. However, his impressive performance during the season could not avoid Tai Po's relegation to the Second Division.

Yokohama FC Hong Kong
On 7 June 2013, Li joined fellow First Division club Yokohama FC Hong Kong for free.

International career
Li is a member of the Hong Kong national under-23 football team.

Career statistics

International

Hong Kong U23
As of 3 July 2012

Personal life
Li's elder brother Li Shu-Sun is also a football player who played for Tai Chung in the 2010-11 Hong Kong First Division League season. The siblings' father Li Fat Fai died of a toxic gas accident while working in a dock in Tsing Yi on 31 March 2007.

References

External links
 
Li Shu Yeung at HKFA

1991 births
Living people
Hong Kong footballers
Hong Kong First Division League players
Tai Chung FC players
Yuen Long FC players
Tai Po FC players
Yokohama FC Hong Kong players
Citizen AA players
South China AA players
Association football defenders
Association football midfielders